Lists of animated television series first aired in the 2000s organized by year:

List of animated television series of 2000
List of animated television series of 2001
List of animated television series of 2002
List of animated television series of 2003
List of animated television series of 2004
List of animated television series of 2005
List of animated television series of 2006
List of animated television series of 2007
List of animated television series of 2008
List of animated television series of 2009

2000s
2000s animated television series
2000s television-related lists